Frankie Chan Fan-kei (born 1951) is a Hong Kong-born Chinese martial artist, actor, film director, producer, action director, and composer.

Chan is best known to Hong Kong action cinema fans as the main antagonist in Sammo Hung's The Prodigal Son, in which he faces Yuen Biao in the final reel. Chan has starred in a number of modern action films, most notably Burning Ambition, Outlaw Brothers and Carry On Pickpocket. He also directed and composed many films in the 1970s and 1980s, including The Young Master, Odd Couple and Armour of God II: Operation Condor. In 2011 Chan directed Legendary Amazons, a film about the female Generals of the Yang clan.

Filmography as director
 The Perfect Match (1982)
 Just for Fun (1983)
 Silent Romance (1984)
 Unforgettable Fantasy (1985)
 Goodbye My Love (1986)
 Sweet Surrender (1986)
 The Good, the Bad & the Beauty ( 鬼馬保鎌賊美人,1987)
 Criminal Hunter (1988)
 Angel of Return (1989)
 Outlaw Brothers (1990)
 Fun and Fury (1992)
 A Warrior's Tragedy (1993)
 A Warrior's Tragedy 2 (1993)
 The Wrath of Silence (1994)
 Oh! Yes Sir! (1994)
 Tragic Commitment (1995)
 How to Meet the Lucky Stars (1996)
 I.Q. Dudettes (2000)
 Live and Die in Chicago (2002)
 Legendary Amazons (2011)
 Impetuous Love in Action (2014)
 Super Model Fantasy (2019)

References

External links
 
Frankie Chan Fan-kei at the Hong Kong Movie Database
  Frankie Chan at the Chinese Movie Database
 Frankie Chan at chinesemov.com
 Frankie Chan at hkcinemagic.com

1951 births
Living people
Hong Kong male film actors
Hong Kong martial artists
Hong Kong film score composers
Hong Kong male composers
Hong Kong composers
21st-century Hong Kong male actors
Male film score composers